Rashaad Khimbrel Lawrence Duncan (born December 10, 1986) is former American football defensive tackle. He was signed by the Tampa Bay Buccaneers as an undrafted free agent in 2009. He played college football at Pittsburgh.

He was also a member of the Carolina Panthers, Buffalo Bills, Jacksonville Sharks, and Washington Redskins.

Early life
Duncan was born in Belle Glade, Florida and played high school football at Glades Central High School.  As a senior, he compiled 62 tackles, 16 tackles for losses and nine quarterback sacks and the team finished 10-1, advancing to the regional finals of the Florida 3A playoffs.  He was named All-Palm Beach County, All-Western Conference, and was selected to play in the Outback Steakhouse All-Star Game.  As an All-Florida Class 3A second-team honoree, Duncan helped lead Glades Central to undefeated regular seasons each of his last two years.

Duncan also participated in baseball and track and field.

College career
Duncan played in 48 consecutive games over his last four years at Pitt and was named the Defensive Line MVP in 2008 by the coaching staff.  He compiled 55 tackles and 1.5 sacks as a senior.

Duncan graduated Pittsburgh with a degree in Administration of Justice.

Professional career
Duncan was signed by the Tampa Bay Buccaneers as an undrafted free agent on May 1, 2009.  He was signed to the practice squad on September 7, 2009 and was released on October 13, 2009.  He was then signed to the Carolina Panthers' practice squad on October 20, 2009 and was released on October 27, 2009.  Duncan was signed to the Buffalo Bills’ practice squad on December 1, 2009.

Duncan was signed to the Washington Redskins' practice squad on December 22, 2010. He was waived on July 30, 2011.

References

External links
Washington Redskins bio
Jacksonville Sharks bio
Buffalo Bills bio
Carolina Panthers bio
Pittsburgh Panthers bio

1986 births
Living people
People from Belle Glade, Florida
Players of American football from Florida
American football defensive tackles
Pittsburgh Panthers football players
Tampa Bay Buccaneers players
Carolina Panthers players
Buffalo Bills players
Jacksonville Sharks players
Washington Redskins players